Partex Sporting Club is a team that has played List A cricket in the Dhaka Premier League in 2014–15, 2016–17 and 2019–20. It is owned by the Partex Group of companies.

Playing history
Promoted from the lower division, Partex won their first match in 2014-15 but finished the season with only three wins from 13 matches, and were demoted for the 2015–16 season.

In 2015-16 they finished first in Group A of the non-List-A Dhaka First Division League, and were promoted back to the Dhaka Premier League for 2016–17. However, they won only one match and in May 2017 they were relegated from the 2016–17 Dhaka Premier Division Cricket League back down to the Dhaka First Division Cricket League. In 2018-19 Partex finished second in the Dhaka First Division League and thus qualified to return to the Dhaka Premier League in 2019–20.

List A record
 2014-15: 13 matches, won 3, finished eleventh
 2016-17: 13 matches, won 1, finished twelfth

Rajin Saleh and Mehrab Hossain captained the team in 2014–15, and there were several captains in 2016–17.

Records
Their highest score is 111 not out by Roshen Silva in 2014–15, and the best bowling figures are 5 for 42 by Imran Ali in 2016–17.

References

External links
 Partex Sporting Club at CricketArchive

Dhaka Premier Division Cricket League teams